Genesee Park is a park in Jefferson County, Colorado. The land for Genesee Park was initially purchased in 1912 and the park area was largely complete by 1926.

The park also contains forests of ponderosa pine, Douglas-fir, and lodgepole pine. Interstate 70 traverses the park between exits 252 and 254 along the Lariat Loop Scenic & Historic Byway. On I-70 just west of exit 254, there are scenic overlooks for both directions for viewing the historic Bison herd, which live on maintained pastures on the north and south sides of I-70. The park's bison herd is owned by the City and County of Denver. Some of the original bison were acquired from Yellowstone National Park in 1914. Thirty five bison were distributed to Native American tribes in 2023.

Chief Hosa Lodge, designed by Jacques Benedict, was built in 1918. A historical point of interest near Exit 253, it is used as an event facility. The nearby Chief Hosa Campground serves recreational travelers each year between May and September. A large stone picnic shelter near Genesee Mountain was built by the Civilian Conservation Corps in 1939. There is  a "Braille trail" area with signs and guide ropes.

See also
National Register of Historic Places listings in Jefferson County, Colorado

References

External links 

 Denver Mountain Parks: Genesee Park at Denvergov.org
 Genesee Park History at Denvergov.org

Parks on the National Register of Historic Places in Colorado
1918 establishments in Colorado
Denver Mountain Parks
Protected areas of Jefferson County, Colorado
Historic districts on the National Register of Historic Places in Colorado
National Register of Historic Places in Jefferson County, Colorado
Braille trail sites
Bison herds
Grasslands of Colorado